Pierre-Marcellin Boule (1 January 1861 – 4 July 1942), better known as merely Marcellin Boule, was a French palaeontologist, geologist, and anthropologist.

Early life and education
Pierre-Marcellin Boule was born in Montsalvy, France.

Career 
Boule was a professor at the Muséum National d’Histoire Naturelle, Paris (1902–36) and "for many years director of the Institut de Paléontologie Humaine, Paris." He was an editor (1893–1940) of the journal L’Anthropologie (and contributed articles to it) and was the founder of two other scientific journals.

Boule studied and published in 1910 the first analysis of a complete Neanderthal specimen. The fossil discovered in La Chapelle-aux-Saints was an old man, and Boule characterized it as brutish, bent-kneed and not a fully erect biped. In an illustration Boule commissioned, the Neanderthal was characterized as a hairy gorilla-like figure with opposable toes, according to a skeleton which was already distorted with arthritis. As a result, Neanderthals were viewed in subsequent decades as being highly primitive creatures with no direct relation to anatomically modern humans. Later re-evaluations of the La Chapelle-aux-Saints skeleton have roundly discredited Boule's initial work on the specimen.

He was one of the first to argue that eoliths were not manmade.

Boule also expressed some scepticism about the Piltdown man discovery — later revealed to be a hoax. As early as 1915, Boule recognized that the jaw belonged to an ape rather than an ancient human. However, the Piltdown forgery has been characterised as providing evidential support for Boule's "branching evolution" conclusions drawn from his Neanderthal research — research which is likewise said to have "prepar[ed] the international community for the appearance of a non-Neanderthal fossil such as Piltdown Man."

Personal life and demise
Boule died at age 81 in the same town where he was born, Montsalvy, France.

References and sources

External links
 

1861 births
1942 deaths
People from Cantal
French paleontologists
Wollaston Medal winners